Belyayevka is a rural locality (a village) in Baydarovskoye Rural Settlement, Nikolsky District, Vologda Oblast, Russia. The population was 59 as of 2002.

Geography 
Belyayevka is located 28 km northeast of Nikolsk (the district's administrative centre) by road. Malye Gari is the nearest rural locality.

References 

Rural localities in Nikolsky District, Vologda Oblast